Fatima Sheikh (9 January 1831 – 9 October 1900) was an Indian educator and social reformer, who was a colleague of the social reformers Jyotirao Phule and Savitribai Phule She is widely considered to be India’s first Muslim woman teacher.

Biography 
Fatima Sheikh was the sister of Mian Usman Sheikh, in whose house Jyotirao and Savitribai Phule took up residence. One of the first Muslim women teachers of modern India, she started educating Bahujan children in Phules' school. Jyotirao and Savitribai Phule along with Fatima Sheikh took charge of spreading education among the downtrodden communities.

Sheikh met Savitribai Phule while both were enrolled at a teacher training institution run by Cynthia Farrar, an American missionary. She taught at all five schools that the Phules went on to establish and she taught children of all religions and castes. Sheikh took part in the founding of two schools in Mumbai (Then Bombay) in 1851.

In popular culture
On 9 January 2022, Google honoured Fatima Sheikh with a doodle on her 191st birth anniversary.

References

External links
  Why Indian history has forgotten Fatima Sheikh but remembers Savitribai Phule – article from ThePrint
 

19th-century Indian educators
19th-century Indian Muslims
Jyotirao Phule
People from Maharashtra
Founders of Indian schools and colleges
1831 births
Year of death missing